Ma Xiaonian (Simplified Chinese: 马晓年; Traditional Chinese: 馬曉年; pinyin: Mǎ Xiǎo Nián; born May 8, 1945, Fenyang, Shanxi, China), is a Chinese physician and professor of sexual medicine  who pioneered the field of sexual medicine and sexology in China. Ma's research on sexual medicine and Chinese sexuality has profoundly influenced cultural and social values in China since the 1980s. His recent sexological work has focused primarily on Chinese female sexuality

References

1945 births
People from Lüliang
Chinese sexologists
Living people